Macrargus is a genus of dwarf spiders that was first described by Friedrich Dahl in 1886.

Species
 it contains five species:
Macrargus boreus Holm, 1968 – Sweden, Finland, Estonia, Russia
Macrargus carpenteri (O. Pickard-Cambridge, 1895) – Europe
Macrargus multesimus (O. Pickard-Cambridge, 1875) – North America, Europe, Russia (European to Far East), China, Mongolia
Macrargus rufus (Wider, 1834) (type) – Europe
Macrargus sumyensis Gnelitsa & Koponen, 2010 – Ukraine, Belarus

See also
 List of Linyphiidae species (I–P)

References

Araneomorphae genera
Linyphiidae
Spiders of Asia
Taxa named by Friedrich Dahl